Tonoike (written: 外池 or 外ノ池) is a Japanese surname. Notable people with the surname include:

, Japanese speed skater
, Japanese footballer

Japanese-language surnames